Gergő Menyhért (born 22 October 1989) is a Hungarian football player who currently plays for Diósgyőri VTK.

External links
 Profile

1989 births
Living people
Sportspeople from Miskolc
Hungarian footballers
Association football defenders
Diósgyőri VTK players
Bőcs KSC footballers
Kaposvölgye VSC footballers